Salix prolixa is a species of willow known by the common name MacKenzie's willow. It is native to western North America from Alaska and north-western Canada to the high mountains of California and Utah. It grows in moist habitat such as riverbanks, springs, and marshes. It is a shrub growing 1 to 5 meters tall. The lance-shaped or pointed, oval leaves are up to 15 cm long, hairless, waxy on the undersides, and accompanied by wide stipules. The inflorescence is a catkin of flowers.

External links
Jepson Manual Treatment
Washington Burke Museum

prolixa